Face the Music may refer to:

Film and television
 Face the Music (film), a 1954 British crime film directed by Terence Fisher
 Face the Music, a 1993 film starring Molly Ringwald and Patrick Dempsey
 Face the Music, a 2000 film featuring Tyler Christopher
 Face the Music (American  game show), a 1980–1981 music quiz show
 Face the Music (British game show), a 1967–1984 music quiz show
 Face the Music (New Zealand game show), a 1992–1994 music quiz show
 Bill & Ted Face the Music, the third film of the Bill & Ted franchise (2020)

Literature
 Face the Music, a 1954 novel by Ernest Bornemann, basis for the 1954 film
 Face the Music, a 2014 novel by Greg Anton
 Face the Music, a Hannah Montana television series novelization
 Face the Music: A Life Exposed, a 2014 memoir by Paul Stanley

Music
 Face the Music (music ensemble), a classical youth ensemble from New York City
 Face the Music (musical), a 1932 Broadway musical

Albums
 Face the Music (Avant album), 2013
 Face the Music (Burning Rain album) or the title song, 2019
 Face the Music (Electric Light Orchestra album), 1975
 Face the Music (Melody Club album), 2004
 Face the Music (New Kids on the Block album) or the title song, 1994
 Face the Music (EP), by Marianas Trench, 2013
 Face the Music, by Meg Christian, 1977
 Face the Music, by George Duke, 2002
 Face the Music, by Sinne Eeg, 2014
 Face the Music, by Nils Lofgren, 2014
 Face the Music, by Rick Moses, 1978

Songs
 "Face the Music", by Conjure One from Extraordinary Ways, 2005
 "Face the Music", by Wyld Stallyns from the film Bill & Ted Face the Music, 2020

See also 

 
 Facing the Music (disambiguation)